The Symphony No. 4 in C-sharp minor by Alexander Tansman was written between 1936 and 1939. In the meantime Tansman acquired French citizenship and married pianist Colette Cras, to whom the symphony is dedicated (À ma femme). Despite dating from his most successful period it wasn't premiered in his lifetime, only receiving its first performance in a 1998 studio recording by the Bamberg Symphony conducted by Israel Yinon, 12 years after the composer's death.

It lasts around 20/25 minutes and consists of three movements: a tense Allegro with a somber slow introduction, an introspective Adagio for strings alone and a contrapuntal finale fusing baroque and jazz influences which has been compared to Hindemith.

 Adagio — Allegro deciso
 Adagio tranquillo
 Allegro giocoso

Recordings
  Bamberg Symphony — Israel Yinon, 2001. Koch Schwann
  Podlasie Philharmonic — Marcin Nałęcz-Niesiołowski. Dux
  Melbourne Symphony — Oleg Caetani, 2005. Chandos

References

Compositions by Alexandre Tansman
1939 compositions
Compositions in C-sharp minor
Tansman 4